Robert (R. W.) Gray is a Canadian writer, filmmaker and academic.

Originally from Prince Rupert, British Columbia, he was educated at the University of Victoria, the University of Manitoba and the University of Alberta. He taught screenwriting at the Vancouver Film School in the early 2000s, and published two serialized novels, Tide Pool Sketches (2001) and Waterboys (2004), in Xtra! West during this era.

His debut short story collection Crisp was published in 2010, and was shortlisted for the Danuta Gleed Literary Award in 2011.

His second short story collection, Entropic, followed in 2015, winning him the Thomas Head Raddall Award. He has also published both poetry and short stories in Arc, Grain, Event, The Fiddlehead, Malahat Review and dANDelion. His poems "How this begins", "Flutter", "Bite" and "Outside the Café" appeared in John Barton and Billeh Nickerson's 2007 anthology Seminal: The Anthology of Canada's Gay Male Poets.

As a screenwriter, he has written six short films, of which he directed two. He has also produced several short films for other directors.

He is currently based in Fredericton, New Brunswick, where he teaches in the film studies department at the University of New Brunswick and is an organizer of the annual Fredericton 48-Hour Film Competition. He is also a senior editor and film critic for the web magazine Numéro Cinq.

Bibliography
Tide Pool Sketches (2001)
Waterboys (2004)
Crisp (2010)
Entropic (2015)

Filmography
Tableware (2007)
Alice & Huck (2008)
Blink (2014)
Objects Are Closer (2012)
The Wall (2013)
Zack & Luc (2014)

References

External links

Robert Gray faculty profile at the University of New Brunswick

21st-century Canadian poets
21st-century Canadian novelists
Canadian male novelists
Canadian male short story writers
Canadian male poets
Writers from British Columbia
Writers from Fredericton
People from Prince Rupert, British Columbia
University of Victoria alumni
University of Manitoba alumni
University of Alberta alumni
Academic staff of the University of New Brunswick
Canadian film critics
Canadian magazine editors
Screenwriters from British Columbia
Film directors from British Columbia
Canadian LGBT screenwriters
LGBT film directors
Canadian gay writers
Canadian LGBT novelists
Canadian LGBT poets
Living people
Year of birth missing (living people)
21st-century Canadian short story writers
21st-century Canadian male writers
Canadian male non-fiction writers
Film directors from New Brunswick
21st-century Canadian screenwriters
Gay poets
Gay screenwriters
Gay novelists
Film producers from New Brunswick
21st-century Canadian LGBT people